"Algo pequeñito" ("Something Tiny") is a song recorded by Spanish singer Daniel Diges. The song was written by Jesús Cañadilla, Luis Miguel de la Varga, Alberto Jodar and Daniel Diges himself. It is best known as the Spanish entry at the Eurovision Song Contest 2010, in Oslo.

The song, which is based on the classic waltz rhythm, was the winner of the Spanish national final Eurovisión: Destino Oslo, held on 22 February. It is the first single released from his self-titled album Daniel Diges.

Background

"Algo pequeñito" is the second song ever written by its author, Jesús Cañadilla, a fan of the Eurovision Song Contest. He had previously written the song "Sumando puntos" to submit it to the Spanish Eurovision preselection of 2009, sung by himself under the stage name Bayarte. Once he had written the song "Algo pequeñito" he contacted several potential performers without luck. He eventually contacted actor Daniel Diges through a friend and he liked the song. On 5 January 2010, seven days before the closing date for submissions for the Spanish Eurovision national final, Daniel Diges flew from Tenerife, where he was on tour with the musical Mamma Mia!, to Madrid to record the song. Alejandro de Pinedo took charge of the musical production.

Versions
Once the song was chosen as the Spanish Eurovision entry, a mastered version was made public on March 11, 2010. In the mastered version, computer sounds were replaced by real instruments and Daniel gave the song a more rock influence with his vocal performance, mirroring his live performance at the Spanish national final. On 13 April 2010 the song was made available for digital download on iTunes.

Daniel Diges' first album, self-titled Daniel Diges, includes the mastered Eurovision version of the song and an alternative swing-jazz version.

Eurovision 2010
The song automatically qualified for the final of the contest on 29 May 2010. It finished 15th with 68 points.

The performance at the finals was disturbed as a known Catalan stunt-man named Jaume Marquet Cot (better known as Jimmy Jump) stormed the stage during Diges' performance. In accordance with the rules he was allowed to perform again after the last song.

Music video
During the second weekend of March 2010 (12–14 March), a music video for "Algo pequeñito" was shot by director Santiago Tabernero at outdoor and indoor locations in Madrid. The video, released on 19 March, is set in an abandoned circus that comes back to life with the song, and depicts Daniel Diges as the circus master.

Covers
In 2011, Anne-Marie David, winner of the Eurovision Song Contest 1973, covered the song with most lyrics in French.

Charts

References

External links
 Official music video at YouTube
 Profile and lyrics at Eurovision.tv
 Profile and lyrics at BBC Online
 Profile and lyrics at The Diggiloo Thrush

Eurovision songs of 2010
Eurovision songs of Spain
2010 singles
2010 songs
Warner Music Group singles